Belén is a  department of Catamarca Province in Argentina.

Economy

The mainstay of the economy is farming, but there are also a number of mines in the department, with the extraction of gold, silver and various minerals.

External links
Belén webpage (Spanish)
Live Argentina Website

Departments of Catamarca Province